Speaker stands are stands on which loudspeakers are placed with the aim of improving the quality of sound from the speaker.

In the 1970s musicians and high fidelity enthusiasts found that lifting speakers off the ground and mounting them on something with no vibration increased sound quality. Ordinary domestic furniture was not built with the properties that would deaden vibrations and so enhance the speaker's sound. Speaker stands, therefore were purpose-built to remove any deleterious colourations that came about through unwanted vibration.

Further research has shown that speakers are best positioned so that the tweeter is level with the ear of the listener and so speaker stands are often built so that they line up the speakers with the ear of a person when sitting down.

See also
 Loudspeaker
 Loudspeaker enclosure

References

External links
 How to position your speakers An article on getting the most out of speaker positioning.
 ALMA - The International Loudspeaker Association - A Forum for the Global Loudspeaker Industry

Loudspeakers